Dillon Gabriel (born December 28, 2000) is an American football quarterback for the Oklahoma Sooners. Gabriel attended and played high school football at Mililani High School in Mililani, Hawaii and began his college career at UCF in 2019 before transferring to Oklahoma in 2022.

Early years
Gabriel attended Mililani High School in Mililani, Hawaii. As a senior in 2018, he was the Gatorade High School Football Player of the Year for Hawaii after passing for 3,754 yards, 38 touchdowns. He finished his career with 9,948 yards passing yards, 105 touchdowns. Gabriel committed to the University of Central Florida (UCF) to play college football.

College career

UCF
Gabriel entered his first year at UCF in 2019 as the backup to Brandon Wimbush, but took over during the first game and started the final 12 games of the season as the Knights finished with a 10–3 record capping with a 48–25 victory over Marshall at the Gasparilla Bowl. For the season, he completed 236 of 398 passes for 3,653 yards, 29 touchdowns, and seven interceptions.

In his sophomore year, Gabriel led the Knights to a 6–4 record and an appearance in the Boca Raton Bowl completing 21 of 45 for 217 yards and 2 touchdowns in a 49–23 loss.

On September 17, 2021, in a regular season game against Louisville, Gabriel was injured on the final play of the game, a multi-lateral attempt at a miracle touchdown by the Knights. Gabriel was carted off the field and X-rays were taken of his shoulder after the game. He suffered a broken left clavicle that, despite not requiring surgery, ultimately ended his season early.

On November 27, 2021, Gabriel announced via social media that he would be transferring from UCF.

Oklahoma
On December 16, 2021, Gabriel originally announced he would transfer to University of California, Los Angeles (UCLA). However, less than three weeks later, Gabriel announced he would transfer to the University of Oklahoma on January 3, 2022.

College statistics

References

External links
UCF Knights bio

2000 births
Living people
American football quarterbacks
People from Honolulu County, Hawaii
Players of American football from Hawaii
Oklahoma Sooners football players
UCF Knights football players